Mario R. García (born February 15, 1947, in Placetas, Las Villas, Cuba) is a Cuban-American newspaper and magazine designer and media consultant. He arrived from Cuba to the United States on Feb. 28, 1962, as one of the so-called Pedro Pans (14000 refugee children who arrived in the US soon after the Castro Revolution). He is senior adviser on news design/adjunct professor at Columbia University, School of Journalism. He was named the Hearst Digital Media Professional-in-Residence for 2013–14 there.

Columbia Journalism School faculty bio for Dr. Mario Garcia
https://journalism.columbia.edu/faculty/mario-garcia

Career
Garcia collaborated with more than 700 publications. He redesigned large publications such as The Wall Street Journal, Miami Herald, The Washington Post, Norway's Aftenposten, UAE's Gulf News, The Philadelphia Inquirer, Handelsblatt, Die Zeit, The Hindu, Malayala Manorama, Sakshi, and Paris Match; medium-size newspapers, such as The Charlotte Observer, România Liberă, and the 40 business weeklies of American City Business Journals; and smaller newspapers, such as the Lawrence Journal-World.

He was appointed the head of Syracuse University's School of Graphic Arts in 1977. García was the first recipient of the Society for News Design's Lifetime Achievement Award. In 2006 People en Español chose him as one of the 100 most influential Hispanics. In October 2011 he was awarded the Missouri Honor Medal for Distinguished Service in Journalism by the Missouri School of Journalism.

In September 2012, García published his thirteenth book, and first e-book, iPad Design Lab: Storytelling in the Age of the Tablet.

His latest book, The Story, is a trilogy about mobile storytelling: Transformation, Storytelling, Design (available from amazon.com). There is a Spanish edition of The Story, also available from amazon.com.

His writings are frequently profiled by such magazines as Columbia Journalism Review as well as the executive summaries of the World Association of Newspapers (WAN-IFRA), the American Press Institute and The Poynter Institute for Media Studies.

Works

Columbia Journalism School faculty bio for Dr. Mario Garcia

Recent writings 

Mario Garcia's latest book, a trilogy, is The Story, a guide to mobile/digital storytelling. The three volumes include Transformation, Storytelling and Design. Available from amazon.com

Visual Storytelling

Briefings and email newsletters

Sponsored ad/native advertising

References

External links
Official García Media biography

1947 births
Living people
People from Placetas
Cuban emigrants to the United States
Newspaper designers
American graphic designers
20th-century American journalists
American male journalists